The Korps Communicatie & Engagement Prinses Ariane (Corps of Communication & Engagement Princess Ariane) of the Royal Netherlands Army is a corps within the Arm of the Information Manoeuver, which was established as of 20 November 2020. It is named after Princess Ariane of the Netherlands.

Organization
The unit specializes in civil-military interaction and communication in the broadest sense of the word. The deployment can be in mission areas but also in the Netherlands. The corps has a wide pool of military personnel, professionals and reservists, with various (civilian) specialisms. In addition, the force also has specialists in the field of psychological operations (PSYOP). The corps consists of personnel from the following units:
 Civil and Military Interaction Command (1 CMI-Co)
 Other army personnel working within the communication and engagement chain

References

See also 
 Dutch Military Intelligence and Security Service

Army units and formations of the Netherlands
2020 establishments in the Netherlands
Military units and formations established in 2020